The 2013–14 CERS Cup was the 34th season of the CERS Cup, Europe's second club roller hockey competition organized by CERH. Thirty-one teams from eight national associations qualified for the competition as a result of their respective national league placing in the previous season. Following a preliminary phase and two knockout rounds, CE Noia won the tournament at its final four, in HC Forte dei Marmi, Italy on 5–6 April 2014.

Teams 
Thirty-one teams from eight national associations qualified for the competition.

Preliminary phase 
The preliminary phase legs took place on 9 and 23 November 2013.

|}

Knockout phase

Final-Four

Semi-finals

Final

See also
2013–14 CERH European League
2013–14 CERH Women's European League

References

External links
 CERH website
  Roller Hockey links worldwide
  Mundook-World Roller Hockey

World Skate Europe Cup
CERS Cup
CERS Cup
2013 in Italian sport
2014 in Italian sport
International roller hockey competitions hosted by Italy